Drumchapel railway station serves the Drumchapel, Blairdardie and Old Drumchapel areas of Glasgow, Scotland. The station is managed by ScotRail and is served by trains on the Argyle Line and North Clyde Line.

The station is situated on Garscadden Road. It has a car park facility as well as a bus terminus.

Facilities
The station has a small car park with an assortment of spaces (including a car parking block) and a staffed ticket office with usual operating hours.

Services 
On Mondays-Saturdays, trains between  &  stop each way every 30 minutes.

The station is situated on the suburban Glasgow portion of the West Highland Way Line. However, none of these services stop here.

References

Sources 
 
 

Railway stations in Glasgow
Former North British Railway stations
Railway stations in Great Britain opened in 1890
SPT railway stations
Railway stations served by ScotRail
Drumchapel